Winchester House may refer to:

in England
Winchester Palace, former residence of the Bishops of Winchester in London, also known as Winchester House
Winchester House, Chelsea, a later former residence of the Bishops of Winchester in London
Winchester House, Putney, 18th century private club in London
in the United States
Winchester Mystery House, San Jose, in Santa Clara County, listed on the National Register of Historic Places (NRHP)
Averitt-Winchester House, Miccosukee, Florida, in Leon County, NRHP-listed
Winchester House (Louisville, Kentucky), in Jefferson County, NRHP-listed
Winchester House (Natchez, Mississippi), in Adams County, NRHP-listed

See also
Winchester Building, Little Rock, Arkansas, formerly known as Winchester Auto Store, NRHP-listed